Harold Frank Baker (4 May 1884 – 5 May 1954) was an English cricketer who played two first-class games for Worcestershire in 1911. He made his first-class debut in the same match as the slightly more successful James Turner.

Baker scored a total of 23 runs in four innings with the bat, with a top score of 8. He made one catch, to dismiss Gloucestershire player Arthur Nott.

Baker was born in Walsall, then in Staffordshire. He died one day after his 70th birthday in West Hagley, Worcestershire.

Notes

References
 
 

1884 births
1954 deaths
English cricketers
Worcestershire cricketers
Sportspeople from Walsall